This list shows the awards and nominations received by South Korean artist Taeyang.



Awards and nominations

Listicles

See also 
 List of awards and nominations received by Big Bang
 List of awards and nominations received by GD X Taeyang

References 

Taeyang
Taeyang